Rubén Fernando dos Santos Madruga (born 16 November 1969 in Montevideo) is a former Uruguayan footballer.

International career
Dos Santos made seven appearances for the senior Uruguay national football team from 1991 to 1997.

References

 

1969 births
Living people
Footballers from Montevideo
Uruguayan footballers
Uruguayan expatriate footballers
Uruguay international footballers
1991 Copa América players
Uruguayan Primera División players
Categoría Primera A players
Peñarol players
Central Español players
Defensor Sporting players
C.A. Bella Vista players
Deportivo Cali footballers
Club Olimpia footballers
Expatriate footballers in Colombia
Expatriate footballers in Paraguay
Association football defenders